The 2018 Invictus Games was an adaptive mulit-sport event for wounded, injured and ill veteran and active defence personnel, held in Sydney, New South Wales, Australia. The fourth Invictus Games, an event founded in 2014 by Prince Harry, included 13 sports (11 medal sports). It was the first Invictus Games held in the southern hemisphere.

Development and preparation

Venues
The events were staged on and around Sydney Harbour and at  Sydney Olympic Park, in venues used for the 2000 Summer Olympics.
Cockatoo Island - Jaguar Land Rover Driving Challenge
Genea Netball Centre - Sitting Volleyball pool matches, Powerlifting heats and finals.
Quaycentre - Sitting Volleyball semi-finals and finals, Wheelchair Rugby pool matches, semi-finals and finals, Wheelchair Basketball pool matches, semi-finals and finals.
Qudos Bank Arena - Closing Ceremony
Farm Cove / Royal Botanic Garden, Sydney - Sailing heats and finals, Road Cycling
Sydney Olympic Park Aquatic Centre - Swimming heats and finals
Sydney Olympic Park Athletic Centre - Athletics
Sydney Olympic Park Hockey Centre - Archery
NSW Tennis Centre - Wheelchair Tennis
Sydney Opera House - Opening Ceremony

Funding
Jaguar Land Rover was the Presenting Partner for 2018 Sydney Invictus Games, as it had been for the Invictus Games since its inception in London in 2014. Premier Partners were Fisher House Foundation, Medibank, Sage Group, UNSW Canberra and Westpac. Aon, Boeing, Defence Housing Australia, Fidelity, Hyatt Regency Sydney, icare, ISPS Handa, Leidos, Lockheed Martin, Minter Ellison, Raytheon, Royal Australian Mint, SAAB Australia, Ticketek, Unisys and Workwear Group were Official Supporters. The event Official Suppliers were Amazon, Accor, CSM Live, George P. Johnson, Gold Medal Systems,  Goodman, Great Big Events, Harvey Norman, Isentia, Norwest, Ottobock, Pages and Technical Direction Company.  The Packer Family Foundation was a Philanthropic Supporter. Founding Partners were the Australian Defence Force, Deloitte, Legacy NSW, Clubs NSW and RSL NSW. The Australian government donated $10,000 to the Games to mark the occasion of the wedding of Prince Harry and Meghan Markle.

The Games

Participating nations
All 17 countries from the 2017 Games were invited to attend, with Poland joining for the first time, for a total of 18 countries.

 (host)

Another team titled "Unconquered" also participated in certain events consisting of competitors from multiple nations.

Source:

Sports
There were 12 adaptive sports contested at the Games (with golf and wheelchair tennis as non-medal sports) as well as the Jaguar Land Rover Driving Challenge.

Jaguar Land Rover Driving Challenge (1)

Wheelchair rugby
Wheelchair rugby was held at the Quaycentre over a two-day period from 24 to 25 October. Men and women competed in mixed teams. Competitors from 6 nations competed in wheelchair rugby at the 2018 Invictus Games.

Unconquered (13)

Sitting volleyball
Sitting volleyball was held at the Quaycentre over a two-day period from 22 to 23 October. One event took place, which was jointly staged at the Genea Netball Centre and Quaycentre. Teams from 12 nations competed in this event.

Medal table
There is no competitive medal tally at the Invictus Games. Medals are awarded, but Invictus Games does not endorse or maintain an official scoreboard of gold, silver and bronze medals.

Competitors, not athletes, participate in the event that supports rehabilitation and recovery for wounded, injured and ill defence personnel and veterans.

Medalists

Archery

Athletics
Men

Women

Mixed

Indoor rowing
Men

Women

Jaguar Land Rover driving challenge

Powerlifting

Road cycling
Men

Women

Sailing

Sitting volleyball

Swimming
Men

Women

Mixed

Wheelchair basketball

Wheelchair rugby

Media and broadcast
ABC was the broadcast partner for the fourth Invictus Games with extensive broadcasting relating to the Invictus Games broadcast across the network on free-to-air, video on demand (iVIEW), YouTube live streaming, radio, podcasts and online. APN Outdoor was the official outdoor media partner, and Facebook the social media partner.

References

 
2018
2018 in Australian sport
2018 in multi-sport events
2018 in disability sport
2010s in Sydney
Multi-sport events in Australia
October 2018 sports events in Australia
International sports competitions hosted at Sydney Olympic Park